Acleris ochropicta is a species of moth of the family Tortricidae. It is found in China (Shansi).

References

Moths described in 1975
ochropicta
Moths of Asia